Marius Lejeune (2 November 1882 – 5 September 1949) was a French rower. Lejeune won medals with the men's eight at the 1908 and 1909 European Rowing Championships. He also competed in the men's eight event at the 1912 Summer Olympics.

References

1882 births
1949 deaths
French male rowers
Olympic rowers of France
Rowers at the 1912 Summer Olympics
Sportspeople from Amiens
European Rowing Championships medalists